The Field hockey events at the 1974 Asian Games were held in Tehran, Iran between 6 September and 15 September 1974.

Pakistan won the gold medal after beating India in the gold medal match.

Medalists

Results

All times are Iran Standard Time (UTC+03:30)

 Due to stormy weather, the match was abandoned with India leading 6–0; The replay was scheduled for 11 September.

 Due to stormy weather, the match was abandoned with Pakistan leading 4–0; The replay was scheduled for 11 September.

 Since both Malaysia and Japan were tied on points, a play-off game was played to decide the 3rd team.

 Since both Pakistan and India were tied on points, a play-off game was played to decide the gold medalist.

Final standing

References
 Results

External links
Asian Games History

 
1974 Asian Games events
1974
Asian Games
1974 Asian Games